Robert Trajkovski (born 24 July 1972) is an Australian former footballer.

Playing career

Club career
Trajkovski began his senior career with Altona before moving to National Soccer League team Melbourne City. After a season with Melbourne City Trajkovski transferred to Sydney United. He played two season for United between 1995 and 1997. In the 1997/98 season Trajkovski played for Carlton, playing 22 matches. Trajkovski moved to Perth Glory for the 1998/99 season. After playing 73 matches over three seasons for the Glory he moved to Northern Spirit where he saw out his top flight career.

International career
Trajkovski played three matches for the Australian national team between 1996 and 1998.

References

1972 births
Living people
Australian soccer players
Australia international soccer players
National Soccer League (Australia) players
Australian people of Macedonian descent
Carlton S.C. players
Perth Glory FC players
Sydney United 58 FC players
1998 OFC Nations Cup players
Association football defenders